Sar Qaleh (also Romanized as Sar Qal‘eh and Sarqal‘eh) is a village in Zaz-e Sharqi Rural District, Zaz va Mahru District, Aligudarz County, Lorestan Province, Iran. At the 2006 census, its population was 60, in 10 families.

References 

Towns and villages in Aligudarz County